Worlds Apart is a collaborative album by American singer Russell Allen (Symphony X, Adrenaline Mob, Allen-Lande) and Swedish singer Anette Olzon (ex-Nightwish) under the moniker Allen/Olzon. It was released through Frontiers Records on 6 March 2020.

In 2019, Norwegian singer Jørn Lande announced that there would be no more Allen/Lande albums, citing his own lack of enthusiasm. Russell Allen then went forward with this new collaboration with Olzon, which was announced on 19 December 2019.

The first song to be released was the title track, on 17 January 2020. Later, on 18 February, "Never Die" was streamed. On the same day as the album's release, Frontiers streamed the song "What If I Live". Finally, on 27 March, a lyric video for "I'll Never Leave You" was released.

Track listing

Personnel
Russell Allen - lead and backing vocals
Anette Olzon - lead and backing vocals
Magnus Karlsson - guitars, bass guitar, keyboards
Anders Köllerfors - drums

Source:

References

2020 albums
Frontiers Records albums
Vocal duet albums